I mostri (also known as Opiate '67 or, in a cut version, 15 from Rome) is a 1963 commedia all'italiana film by Italian director Dino Risi. It was coproduced with France.

The film was a huge success in Italy. It was censored in Spain. In 1977 an Academy Award nominee sequel was filmed, entitled I nuovi mostri (Viva Italia!).

Plot
The film features several episodes in which actors Ugo Tognazzi and Vittorio Gassman are the greatest performers. The themes of the short stories are intended to offer a clear picture of the habits, vices, of cheating and taste typical of the majority of Italians in the Sixties. Obviously the characters and funny situations are written and staged in a way that touches the limits of satire and coarseness, but many of these issues are still recognized by the Italian company. The satire of the episodes affects people of both noble origins of poor people, both political and police officers who abuse their power and, last but not least the middle classes. The episode The Monster depicts a man who has killed the whole family and has barricaded himself in the house was arrested by two policemen (Gassman and Tognazzi) and photographed with the present. However, although the man is a murderer, the two cops are real monsters of ugliness. Another episode is Education in which the parent Ugo Tognazzi educates his son (Ricky Tognazzi) being a perfect cheat to appear more masculine and smart, to pay much less and not plunging into heavy or boring situation would certainly not born. He instructs his son in beating their classmates who do not want him to copy the tasks and lie age when he went to the fair to not pay the ticket. When the child grows, the first thing it will do is make amends for his teachings repaying his father with a pistol and with the theft of all his possessions.

Episodes
The original version is composed of 20 episodes, all starred by Vittorio Gassman and Ugo Tognazzi:
 "L'educazione sentimentale"
 "La raccomandazione"
 "Il mostro"
 "Come un padre"
 "Presa dalla vita"
 "Il povero soldato"
 "Che vitaccia"
 "La giornata dell'onorevole"
 "Latin lovers"
 "Testimone volontario"
 "I due orfanelli"
 "L'agguato"
 "Il sacrificato"
 "Vernissage"
 "La musa"
 "Scende l'oblio"
 "La strada è di tutti"
 "L'oppio dei popoli"
 "Il testamento di Francesco"
 "La nobile arte"

External links
 

1963 films
1963 comedy films
1960s Italian-language films
Italian black-and-white films
Films set in Italy
Films set in Rome
Commedia all'italiana
Italian anthology films
Films directed by Dino Risi
Films with screenplays by Age & Scarpelli
Films with screenplays by Ruggero Maccari
Films scored by Armando Trovajoli
1960s Italian films